Puttichai Kasetsin (born 3 July 1986), better known as Push is a Thai actor, model, DJ and TV host. He gained popularity in his acting career after starring in Ugly Duckling: Perfect Match, I Wanna Be Sup'tar, and U-Prince Series: Handsome Cowboy.

Early life and education
Puttichai was born on 3 July 1986 in Ratchaburi, a province in central Thailand. He is the fourth son in a family of six sons.  His parents are of Chinese descent. His family used to be in an agriculture business in Ratchaburi.  Puttichai had hoped to become a professional football player before getting persuaded into the entertainment scene by his school senior.

Puttichai completed elementary school at Wantha Maria Ratchaburi School, then had his secondary and high school education at Prasartratprachakit School.  He graduated in Communication Arts from Rajabhat Suan Dusit University.

Career

2010–13: Career beginnings
Puttichai started his career under GMM Grammy Co.,Ltd. as a DJ of HOTWAVE 91.5FM, then later a DJ for Chill FM and a host of O:IC TV show. His acting career began when he received a small role in Koo Rak Tang Kua sitcom by TV Thunder. Next,  he got a police role in Jood Nad Pob series on Channel 3 in which he appeared on Episode 23 - 80. Later he took on several small roles in lakorns.

2014 : Taking on the lead roles
In 2014, Exact gave Puttichai the debut as a lead actor in Leh Nangfah with Wannarot Sonthichai (Vill).  Since then he has slowly started to gain more fans. Push is known to be flirty and silly with his co-stars and quickly becomes friends with them, many said he's easy to get along with. Push's fame starts to grow lakorn after lakorn, making him one of Exact's best actors. Anyhow, working as a radio DJ is still his favourite job as he mentioned "The job has a lot of charm, and each DJ has their own style. Even though I’ve acted in many TV series, DJ work is still my main priority."

2015 - Present: The Next Big Thing- The Road to Stardom across Asia

This year, Puttichai gained more popularity by his work after work. He was never away from Thailand's TV screen all through the year. Started the year like a bomb with Ugly Duckling: Perfect Match on GMM25 Channel, Puttichai won the hearts of youngster & newly grads audience group and created "P'Suea Phenomenon".   In mid 2015, Puttichai expanded his fanbase to traditional Thai lakorn housewives group with Roy Leh Saneh Rai (Hundred Tricks of a Vicious Charmer) on One Channel and to urban white collar group with Club Friday The Series 6 : Kwarm Ruk Mai Pid...Pid Tee...Ter Plian Pai on GMM25 Channel.

In late 2015, he became the next big thing in the scene with his superstar role in I Wanna Be Sup'tar. All these works helped him almost clean-sweep all the breakthrough awards, including Most Charming Guy Award from Siam Dara Stars Awards 2015, The Heartthrob Award from Hamburger Awards 2015 and Seventeen Choice Hottie Male from SEVENTEEN Choices Awards 2015.
Puttichai introduced another mini-series, Love Flight, in which he co-starred Ungsumalynn Sirapatsakmetha at the end of 2015 as a conclusion of his busy year.

In 2017, Puttichai was invited for the first time to participate as the main role in the Chinese drama Stairway to Stardom.

In 2019, he collaborated with Pimchanok Luevisadpaibul (Baifern) in The Fallen Leaves. The drama gained massive popularity across Asia, where Puttichai was also crowned as "National Husband" by Thai nationals of his role as Nira's uncle. Later of the same year, in response to the love of Chinese fans, Puttichai held his first fan-meeting in Nanjing, China.

After the success of The Fallen Leaves, Puttichai has started to take up several leading roles of Thai remakes from Chinese dramas, like Boss & Me Thai and You are my Heartbeat which he co-stars with Sushar Manaying (Aom) and Davika Hoorne (Mai) respectively. In 2022, Puttichai has confirmed to star in Dong Dok Mai alongside four female leads, where he is going to take up the main role as Pongdanai, a young womanizer with vicious charm.

Personal life 
On November 16, 2018, he married actress Warattaya Nilkuha.On November 24, 2022, he and his wife welcomed their first child, a son.

Filmography

Television series

Master of Ceremony: MC

Drama Organizer 
 2022 You are my Heartbeat - จังหวะหัวใจนายสะอาด (Insight Entertainment, Act9 Productions/PPTVHD36)

Awards and nominations

Other Honours

References

External links
 
 

1986 births
Living people
Puttichai Kasetsin
Puttichai Kasetsin
Puttichai Kasetsin
Puttichai Kasetsin
Thai television personalities
Puttichai Kasetsin
Puttichai Kasetsin
Puttichai Kasetsin
Puttichai Kasetsin
Puttichai Kasetsin